U-58 may refer to one of the following German submarines:

 , a Type U 57 submarine launched in 1916 and that served in the First World War until sunk on 17 November 1917
 During the First World War, Germany also had these submarines with similar names:
 , a Type UB III submarine launched in 1917 and sunk on 10 March 1918
 , a Type UC II submarine launched in 1916 and surrendered on 24 November 1918; broken up at Cherbourg in 1921
 , a Type IIC submarine that served in the Second World War until scuttled on 3 May 1945

Submarines of Germany